Jan Sapieha may refer to:
  or Jan Sapieha (c. 1431-1517), progenitor of the Kodeń line of the Sapieha family
 Jan Piotr Sapieha (1569–1611), Polish-Lithuanian nobleman, father of Paweł Jan Sapieha
 Jan Stanisław Sapieha (1589–1635), Chancellor of Lithuania, 1621–1635
 Jan Kazimierz Sapieha the Younger (1637–1720/1642–1720), Duke from 1700, voivode of Wilno, from 1682 Grand Hetman of Lithuania
 Jan Kazimierz Sapieha the Elder (died 1730), Grand Hetman of Lithuania
 Jan Fryderyk Sapieha (1680–1751), Grand Recorder of Lithuania, 1706–1709; from 1716 castellan of Troki; from 1735 Grand Chancellor of Lithuania

See also
 Paweł Jan Sapieha (1609–1665/1610–1665), father of Jan Kazimierz the Younger, voivod of Wilno, from 1656 Grand Hetman of Lithuania
 Kazimierz Sapieha (disambiguation)